is a Prefectural Natural Park in northern Chiba Prefecture, Japan. The park spans the borders of seven municipalities: Abiko, Inzai, Kashiwa, Narita, Sakae, Sakura, and Shisui. The marshes provide an important wetland habitat for wild birds.

See also
 National Parks of Japan
 Ramsar sites in Japan

References

External links
  Map of Inba Tega Prefectural Natural Park

Parks and gardens in Chiba Prefecture
Protected areas established in 1952
1952 establishments in Japan